Talk may refer to:

Communication
 Communication, the encoding and decoding of exchanged messages between people
 Conversation, interactive communication between two or more people
 Lecture, an oral presentation intended to inform or instruct
 Speech, the production of a spoken language

Arts, entertainment, and media
 Talk (film), a 1994 Australian film
 Talk (magazine), an American magazine
 Talk (play), a play by Carl Hancock Rux
 "Talk" (Better Call Saul), a 2018 episode of Better Call Saul
 Talk radio, a radio broadcast program format
 Talk show, a TV or radio broadcast program format

Music

Albums
 Talk (Daniel Johns album), 2015
 Talk (Paul Kelly album), 1981
 Talk (Yes album), 1994
 A Talk, 2014, Hyuna album

Songs
 "Talk" (Coldplay song), 2005
 "Talk" (DJ Snake song), 2016
 "Talk" (Khalid song), 2019
 "Talk" (Yeat song), 2022
 "Talk" (Why Don't We song), 2018
 "Talk", by All Hail the Silence from the album Daggers, 2019
 "Talk", by Boyzone from the album Thank You & Goodnight, 2018
 "Talk", by Budjerah featuring May-a from the EP Conversations, 2022
 "Talk", by Daya from the album Sit Still, Look Pretty, 2016
 "Talk", by Falz from the album Moral Instruction, 2019
 "Talk", by Hozier from the album Wasteland, Baby!, 2019
 "Talk", by Kodaline from the album In a Perfect World, 2013
 "Talk", by Kreesha Turner from the album Passion, 2008
 "Talk", by Lee Konitz and Karl Berger from the album Seasons Change, 1980
 "Talk", by Liv Dawson, 2018
 "Talk", by M.I.A. from the album AIM, 2016
 "Talk", by Michael Sembello from Bossa Nova Hotel, 1983
 "Talk", by Pentagon from the album Universe: The Black Hall, 2020
 "Talk", by Phish from the album Billy Breathes, 1996
 "Talk", by Redgum from the album Midnight Sun, 1986
 "Talk", by the Residents from the album Census Taker, 1985
 "Talk", by Tori Kelly from the album Unbreakable Smile, 2015
 "Talk", by Tracy Bonham from the album The Liverpool Sessions, 1995
 "Talk", by West Coast Bad Boyz from the album West Coast Bad Boyz: High fo Xmas, 1994

Computing
 talk (software), a Unix messaging program
 AppleTalk, an early networking protocol designed by Apple for their Macintosh computers
 Google Talk, a former instant messaging program

See also

 Talk Talk, a British rock group active from 1981 to 1991
 Crosstalk, in electronics, any phenomenon by which a signal transmitted on one circuit or channel of a transmission system creates an undesired effect in another circuit or channel
 Talking head (disambiguation)
 Compulsive talking, beyond the bounds of what is considered to be a socially acceptable amount of talking
 Talk Radio (disambiguation)
 Talk show (disambiguation)
 Talk Talk (disambiguation)
 Talk Talk Talk (disambiguation)
 Talking (disambiguation)
 The Talk (disambiguation)